The Convento de San José de los Carmelitas Descalzos (English: Convent of Saint Joseph of Discalced Carmelites) was a convent located in the city of Zaragoza, that belonged to the Discalced Carmelites. It was demolished recently, in the 1970s.

History
This convent was founded in 1594, located next the camino del Bajo Aragón, on the right bank of the Huerva river, outside the City Walls. Ruined and burned during the French sieges of 1808-1809, it was badly damaged. It was rebuilt in 1814, and in 1835 was Confiscated and nationalized, using as prison, until 1900, as "Penal de San José". In 1908 it was converted to Intendance's barracks, until 1971, when it was included in the "Operación Cuarteles" (Operation Barracks) and sold to the Zaragoza's City Council that demolished a few years later to wide the camino de las Torres to the Ebro, and to make green areas and other roads.

Gallery

See also
 Catholic Church in Spain

References

Demolished buildings and structures in Zaragoza
Roman Catholic churches completed in 1594
1594 establishments in Spain
Former churches in Spain
Discalced Carmelite Order
Defunct prisons in Spain
Buildings and structures demolished in the 1970s
1970s disestablishments in Spain
16th-century Roman Catholic church buildings in Spain